The 2012 Barum Czech Rally Zlín was the ninth round of the 2012 Intercontinental Rally Challenge (IRC) season, and also a round of the European Rally Championship. The fifteen stage asphalt rally took place over 31 August - 2 September 2012. Other than the opening stage on Friday night, all stages were run in daylight.

Results
Juho Hänninen took his third win in the 2012 Intercontinental Rally Challenge season.

Overall

Special stages 

Event has been finished after accident on SS13. Car #32 crashed and one spectator died.

External links 
 The official website for the rally
 The official website of the Intercontinental Rally Challenge
 Results at ewrc-results.com

Czech
Czech Rally
Barum Rally Zlín